Kielce may refer to:

Kielce, a city in central Poland and the capital city of the Świętokrzyskie Voivodeship
Kielce County, a powiat (county) in Poland, in Świętokrzyskie Voivodeship
Kielce Voivodeship, a former unit of administrative division and local government in Poland
SS Kielce, Polish-operated cargo ship

See also
Korona Kielce, a football club
Kolporter Kielce, a Polish women's handball team
Kielce pogrom, the events in 1946 in Kielce when 37 Polish Jews were murdered and 82 wounded
Kielce cemetery massacre, an event in 1943, in which 45 Jewish children were murdered by German Nazis
Kielce Synagogue, a former synagogue in Kielce
Kielce University of Technology, a university in Poland
Kielce City Stadium, a multi-use stadium in Kielce, Poland
Kelce